Partial general elections were held in Belgium on 12 June 1888. The result was a victory for the Catholic Party, which won 98 of the 138 seats in the Chamber of Representatives and 47 of the 69 seats in the Senate.

Under the alternating system, elections were held in only five out of the nine provinces: Antwerp, Brabant, Luxembourg, Namur and West Flanders.

Results

Chamber of Representatives

Senate

References

1880s elections in Belgium
General
Belgium
Belgium